Alvo may refer to: 
Alvo, Nebraska, a village
Oxaprozin, from trade name
Alvo (river), a river in southern Italy